Jerome "Jerry" Cosentino (June 13, 1931 – April 3, 1997) was an American politician from the state of Illinois. He was a Democrat who served as state Treasurer from 1979 until 1983, and again from 1987 until 1991.

Life and politics
Cosentino was born in Chicago.  A trucker, he owned Fast Motor Service, a transport company.  His first elective office was Metropolitan Sanitary District Commissioner in Cook County, an office he held from 1975 to 1979.  Cosentino also held partisan offices, serving as the Democratic committeeman of Palos Township and as a member of the state central committee of the Illinois Democratic Party.

Cosentino was elected to the office of Illinois Treasurer in November 1978, becoming the first Italian-American to be elected to statewide office in Illinois. In 1982, Cosentino did not seek renomination for his position, electing instead to run for the post of Illinois Secretary of State; he lost to Jim Edgar.  After four years in the private sector, Cosentino again sought the office of state Treasurer and was re-elected in November 1986, eventually serving two nonconsecutive terms in this position.

In November 1990, Cosentino ran again for Secretary of State, losing to George Ryan.  After leaving office in January 1991, the former state treasurer was indicted for bank fraud.  He pleaded guilty to this offense in April 1992, and was sentenced to serve nine months in home confinement.  Upon completing this sentence, the former official left Illinois and moved to Naples, Florida, where he died.

References

1931 births
1997 deaths
Businesspeople from Chicago
Politicians from Chicago
Illinois Democrats
American fraudsters
American people of Italian descent
State treasurers of Illinois
Illinois politicians convicted of crimes
20th-century American politicians
20th-century American businesspeople